The Yevpatoria Constituency (No. 21) is a Russian legislative constituency in the Republic of Crimea. The constituency covers Northern and Western Crimea.

Members elected

Election results

2016

|-
! colspan=2 style="background-color:#E9E9E9;text-align:left;vertical-align:top;" |Candidate
! style="background-color:#E9E9E9;text-align:left;vertical-align:top;" |Party
! style="background-color:#E9E9E9;text-align:right;" |Votes
! style="background-color:#E9E9E9;text-align:right;" |%
|-
|style="background-color:"|
|align=left|Svetlana Savchenko
|align=left|United Russia
|189,624
|72.10%
|-
|style="background-color:"|
|align=left|Pavel Shperov
|align=left|Liberal Democratic Party
|19,453
|7.40%
|-
|style="background-color:"|
|align=left|Oleg Solomakhin
|align=left|Communist Party
|15,341
|5.83%
|-
|style="background-color:"|
|align=left|Oleg Bekker
|align=left|A Just Russia
|6,948
|2.64%
|-
|style="background:;"| 
|align=left|Natalya Lebedeva
|align=left|Party of Growth
|6,853
|2.61%
|-
|style="background:;"| 
|align=left|Dmitry Shuba
|align=left|Communists of Russia
|5,554
|2.11%
|-
|style="background-color:"|
|align=left|Vladimir Boushev
|align=left|Rodina
|3,976
|1.51%
|-
|style="background:"| 
|align=left|Valery Tarasov
|align=left|Patriots of Russia
|2,572
|1.18%
|-
|style="background:"| 
|align=left|Igor Siliverstov
|align=left|The Greens
|3,265
|1.24%
|-
| colspan="5" style="background-color:#E9E9E9;"|
|- style="font-weight:bold"
| colspan="3" style="text-align:left;" | Total
| 262,999
| 100%
|-
| colspan="5" style="background-color:#E9E9E9;"|
|- style="font-weight:bold"
| colspan="4" |Source:
|
|}

2021

|-
! colspan=2 style="background-color:#E9E9E9;text-align:left;vertical-align:top;" |Candidate
! style="background-color:#E9E9E9;text-align:left;vertical-align:top;" |Party
! style="background-color:#E9E9E9;text-align:right;" |Votes
! style="background-color:#E9E9E9;text-align:right;" |%
|-
|style="background-color:"|
|align=left|Leonid Babashov
|align=left|Independent
|144,080
|58.17%
|-
|style="background-color:"|
|align=left|Viktoria Bilan
|align=left|A Just Russia — For Truth
|23,678
|9.56%
|-
|style="background:;"| 
|align=left|Sergey Alekseyev
|align=left|Communists of Russia
|17,046
|6.88%
|-
|style="background-color:"|
|align=left|Oksana Taranina
|align=left|Communist Party
|13,753
|5.55%
|-
|style="background-color:"|
|align=left|Sergey Yerkhan
|align=left|Liberal Democratic Party
|11,246
|4.54%
|-
|style="background-color:"|
|align=left|Igor Pilipenko
|align=left|Party of Pensioners
|9,079
|3.67%
|-
|style="background-color:"|
|align=left|Maria Simikchi
|align=left|New People
|8,648
|3.49%
|-
|style="background-color:"|
|align=left|Sergey Shuvaynikov
|align=left|Rodina
|4,988
|2.01%
|-
|style="background:"| 
|align=left|Yury Stavitsky
|align=left|The Greens
|4,523
|1.83%
|-
| colspan="5" style="background-color:#E9E9E9;"|
|- style="font-weight:bold"
| colspan="3" style="text-align:left;" | Total
| 247,693
| 100%
|-
| colspan="5" style="background-color:#E9E9E9;"|
|- style="font-weight:bold"
| colspan="4" |Source:
|
|}

References

Russian legislative constituencies
Politics of Crimea